The 2006 Spanish Formula Three Championship was the sixth Spanish Formula Three season. It began on 8 April at Circuit Ricardo Tormo in Valencia and ended on 12 November at Circuito del Jarama in Montmeló after sixteen races. Ricardo Risatti was crowned series champion.

Teams and drivers
 All teams were Spanish-registered. All cars were powered by Toyota engines and Dunlop tyres. Main class powered by Dallara F305, while Copa Class by Dallara F300 chassis.
{|
|

Calendar

Standings

Drivers' standings
Points were awarded as follows:

Copa de España de F3

Teams' standings

Trofeo Ibérico de Fórmula 3

References

External links
 Official Site

Formula Three season
Euroformula Open Championship seasons
Spanish
Spanish F3